is a town in the municipality of Ulstein, Møre og Romsdal, Norway. The town is the commercial and administrative centre of Ulstein and as such, Ulsteinvik contains 74% of the municipality's population.

Ulstein Church is located in the town, serving the population of the whole municipality. Ulsteinvik received town status on 1 July 2000.

Economy

The town is built in a natural harbour (in fact, the town's name means "Ulstein cove" or "Ulstein inlet"), and has an industry driven largely by shipbuilding, with two major shipyards: Ulstein Verft and Kleven Verft.

The Ulstein Group includes the Ulstein Verft shipyard and a growing number of other marine-related companies, the largest of which are Ulstein Power & Control AS and Ulstein Design & Solutions AS. The town has dozens of other maritime-related firms of all sizes, including the global head office of Rolls-Royce plc's marine division. The strength of this industry through the middle of the first decade of the 21st century has led to significant expansion and new construction, both residential and commercial.

In 2012, Ulsteinvik was the winner of the most attractive town in Norway.

Culture and sports
The Sjøborg theatre, on Ulsteinvik's waterfront, has both film and live theatre venues. It shows a mixture of "global" and Norwegian feature films (3-5 different films at a time over 10-12 showings per week).  In addition, it welcomes a mixture of local and touring live acts, including big band, operatic revues, English- and Norwegian-language dramatic productions and stand-up comedy.

Ulsteinvik is the home of IL Hødd, a multi-sport club that includes a Norwegian First Division (as of 2011) football team.  The team has a large local following, and generates strong attendance at their stadium, Høddvoll.  Hødd also offers several other sports, including handball and rhythmic gymnastics. In 2012, Hødd became national cup champions of Norway, beating Tromsø IL in the final of the 2012 Norwegian Football Cup in the Ullevaal Stadion in Oslo. In addition, Ulsteinvik is the home of smaller clubs in each of basketball and rugby union (Sunnmøre Rugby).  It is also the hometown of men's 400m hurdles world record holder and Olympic champion Karsten Warholm, as well as Norway's first-choice football goalkeeper in the Beijing Olympics, Erika Skarbø whose father Dag is a director at Rolls-Royce Marine,

Ulsteinvik is the birthplace of the underground cartoonist Øystein Runde.

Media
Ulsteinvik is the headquarters of the local subscription-based newspaper Vikebladet Vestposten (commonly known by only the first name), formed by a 1989 merger of two previously-existing newspapers (Vikebladet & Vestposten).  The community is also served by the free regional weekly RegionAvisa and the Ålesund-based daily Sunnmørsposten.

Transport
Norwegian county road Fv 61 runs along the south edge of the town centre, and is the major route connecting Ulsteinvik to points northeast (municipalities of Hareid and Sula, with connections to Ålesund) and south (the villages of Eiksund and Haddal as well as the municipalities of Herøy, Sande, and others). Since its completion in 2008, the Eiksund Tunnel, the world's deepest undersea tunnel, connects Ulsteinvik by road to the mainland via Fv 653.

Ulsteinvik is served by one bus company, Vy Buss, with the express route directly to Oslo operated under its Vy express brand.

See also
List of towns and cities in Norway

References

External links
Ulstein Group
Sjøborg Theatre
IL Hødd - Major local multi-sport club.
Fjord1 - operators of local and regional bus services
Listing of bus routes that operate from or through Ulsteinvik 

Ulstein
Cities and towns in Norway
Populated places in Møre og Romsdal
2000 establishments in Norway